A  is a video game that implements the  (toy vending machine) mechanic. Similar to loot boxes, gacha games entice players to spend in-game currency to receive a random in-game item. Some in-game currency generally can be gained through game play, and some by purchasing it from the game publisher using real-world funds.

Most implementors of the Gacha model are free-to-play (F2P) mobile games.

The  game model began to be widely used in the early 2010s, particularly in Japan. Most of the highest-grossing mobile games in Japan use it, and it has become an integral part of Japanese mobile game culture. The game mechanism is also increasingly used in Chinese and Korean games, as well as Western games. Despite their ubiquity, gacha games have been criticized for being addictive, and are often compared to gambling due to the incentive to spend real-world money on chance-based rewards.

Model

Rolling/pulling
There are many collectable characters, cards, or other items (details will vary based on nature of game). Many of them are obtainable only through a "gacha" mechanic. In this, the player "pulls" or "spins" in a manner analogous to a slot machine or roulette wheel. In doing so they expend a fixed portion of a premium currency in exchange for receiving a random "drop" from the banner "rolled on". Some of the rewards drop less frequently than others. It is common for the schema of item rarities to be public information, dubbed "open gacha". It is common for there to be a rarity tier on around the order of appearing in one percent of rolls. Between this rarity and the commonality of limited-time availability of promoted gacha drops, players are encouraged to roll the  while their desired item is available.

Pity

Some gacha models use a pity system: the player will be guaranteed an item after pulling for that item a large number of times without success. "Soft" pity increases the probability slightly of getting a rare item with every pull, counting up and recalculating the probability until the rare item is received, while "hard" pity uses a counter to keep track of the number of pulls and automatically dispense the rare item after reaching a preset number of rolls.

In-game currency

Games can include multiple in-game currencies with complex schemes for converting between them. This makes it more difficult for the player to model the dollar cost of a unit of a currency that isn't the "premium" one.

It is commonly possible to get the "premium" (obtained with real money) currency through gameplay, albeit in rigorously limited quantities.

Virtual item

Many kinds of virtual items can be in the loot table for a banner. Gameplay units such as cards, characters, equippable gear, or more abstract loot such as "experience" are all possible.

Login and task rewards

In many games,  rewards are essential for players to make progress in the game. Players are generally given free or discounted  in low amounts on a regular schedule, in exchange for logging in or doing in-game tasks.

Common mechanics

Banners
Banners are "pools" of available items (characters, loot, cards, etc) that players can "roll" on. Offered banners can be perpetually available or can have a limited duration. Games generally have some of both, with player retention efforts and in-game advertising emphasizing the limited availability of some or all of the items in the latter.

Limited banners
Sometimes, these banners are limited, such that specific prizes can only be obtained within a specific event time-frame.

Stamina
Stamina is a resource that is required for, and consumed by, core in-game actions such as (in a fighting-oriented game) beginning combat encounters. It regenerates over time, often up to a cap. It can typically be regenerated or gained instantly through some form of microtransaction or premium currency spending.

Variations

Appeal
Game developers have praised  as a free-to-play monetization strategy. Most developers that work primarily with free-to-play games recommend it be incorporated into the game starting with the concept for maximum monetization potential.

It has been debated what makes  so addictive to so many players. Proposed mechanisms include playing on the hunter-gatherer instinct to collect items, as well as the desire to complete a set, effective use of the "fear of missing out", or, simply the same mechanisms that drive gambling.

The model of  has been compared to that of collectible trading card games as well as to gambling.

Whales
An aspect of monetisation commonly found in the financing of  games involves a model where a large part of the game's revenue comes from a very small proportion of players who spend an unusually large amount of money on  rolls, essentially subsidising the game for other players who may spend smaller amounts of money, or even free-to-play players that spend no money at all.  The high-spending players are often colloquially referred to as "whales".

Criticism and controversy

Resemblance to gambling

In May 2012, an article was published in a conservative Japanese newspaper, the Yomiuri Shimbun, that criticized social networking games and specifically  for exploiting the naivety of children to make a profit. The main complaint of the article was that the  model too closely resembled gambling. The paper called for an investigation by Japan's Consumer Affairs Agency to prevent abuse of the system. Several cases of teenagers and even younger kids spending equivalents of over US$1000 have been reported in the media. Within a month of the statement being issued, all major Japanese game publishers had removed complete  rules from their games, though many developers found ways around this. In addition, several lawsuits were launched in Japan against companies selling gacha products, leading to temporary decrease in their stock market value by almost a quarter. Japanese mobile game developers, including GREE and DeNA, worked to establish a self-regulating industry group, the Japan Social Game Association, which was an attempt to push developers from these models, but it did not prove successful, and the Association was disbanded by 2015.

The mechanism has come under scrutiny for its similarity to gambling, and some countries require drop rates to be made public, or have banned certain practices (e.g., complete ). Many players also feel regret after making purchases in these games according to a survey. This type of game has also come under criticism for luring players into spending thousands of dollars at a time to get what they want, and the way  outcomes are presented within the game have also been criticized. Children are likely to be affected by the gambling-like mechanism since mobile devices provides easy access to payment; some game developers also intentionally introduce emotional manipulations and exploitive practices. A 2019 research paper has noted that "the gacha system has proven to be addictive and problematic" and speculated that the loopholes in the gacha system could be exploited for international money laundering.

See also 
 List of gacha games
 Loot box
 Microtransaction

References

Video gaming in Japan